Lago Petroleum Corporation was an oil production company established by Americans in 1923 that exploited the oilfields in Lake Maracaibo.
It was acquired by Standard Oil of New Jersey in 1932. Later it was nationalized.

Ownership

Edward L. Doheny, who owned the Pan American Petroleum and Transport Co., controlled the Barco concession in Colombia through a subsidiary. He became interested in Venezuelan oil operations, including a pipeline from Colombia to Venezuela to reduce the cost of exporting the Colombian oil. After meetings between J.A. Coronil and Doheney's staff, the Lago Petroleum Co. was formed by Preston McGoodwin, Joshua S. Cosden and Payne Whitney Associates, and registered in Delaware on 12 April 1923. 
British-Mexican Petroleum acquired about 25% of its stock.
In 1924 the company took over concessions that had been granted to the British Equatorial Oil Company in addition to properties it had purchased from twenty Venezuelans who had obtained them from General Juan Vicente Gómez, the military ruler of the country.

C. Ledyard Blair's Blair & Co. and Chase Securities sold a controlling stake in Lago to Pan American Petroleum in a complex transaction at the end of 1925.
By the late 1920s a trio of foreign-controlled companies were operating in the eastern Lake Maracaibo region. Shell Oil had the Aranguren concession onshore. Standard of Indiana through Pan American owned Lago's operations in the lake bed.
In 1932 Pan American sold its foreign properties to Standard Oil of New Jersey for about $100 million.
The deal included Pan American's large oil concessions in Venezuela.
Lago Petroleum became a subsidiary of Creole Petroleum Corporation, now the Venezuelan subsidiary of Standard Oil of New Jersey. Included in the sale were the Lago Oil and Transport Company and the Lago Shipping Company, and the finalized plans to build the Lago refinery, "the giant", on Aruba. It later operated under the name Creole Petroleum Company, then under Standard Oil's name, Esso.
The company was nationalized with the rest of the Venezuelan petroleum industry in 1976.

Operations

and produced about 30,000 barrels of crude oil per day.
Oil wells in Lake Maracaibo require drilling platforms. Wooden pilings to support the platforms were vulnerable to teredo worms. 
Lago Petroleum pioneered use of concrete pilings pre-fitted with steel heads and tied together with steel ropes.
Lago's techniques, including use of barges to move heavy equipment around, made the cost of drilling on water lower than that of drilling on land, although taxes and royalties had been set lower by the government on the assumption that costs would be higher. 
The company did not spend money on exploration, but simply drilled wells into the La Rosa field.

Lago discovered the valuable Tía Juana field in 1928.
Standard of Indiana obtained land on Aruba from the Dutch government, built a tanker terminal and refinery there, and started shipping Lago's crude to Aruba in 1925. 
In 1929 Lago had 129 active wells in the lake. In 1929 nineteen lake tankers carried 37 million barrels of crude to the huge refinery being built at the Aruba terminal.
Production was inefficient.  Since the three competing companies were draining a common reservoir, each had an interest in extracting oil as quickly as possible,
although a more deliberate pace would have given greater total output.
At times, hastily built wells collapsed, oil gushed into the lake and caught fire, burning rigs and equipment.

Lago employed Chinese and West Indians as well as Venezuelans, using competition between these groups to keep pay low.
The government saw these foreign workers as a source of labor unrest, and in 1929 prohibited further entry of Afro-Caribbean and Chinese workers and demanded that existing workers have a certificate of employment and good conduct.
Lago employed about 1,400 workers during the 1930s, mostly based in Lagunillas and La Salina.
In 1939 Lago said its employees included 268 foreigners and 3,119 Venezuelans.
Most of the local people were simply day laborers.

See also 

 Lago Colony
 Lake tanker
Lago Oil and Transport Company

References
Notes

Citations

Sources

Oil and gas companies of Venezuela
Defunct oil companies of the United States
Lake Maracaibo
Energy companies established in 1923
Non-renewable resource companies established in 1923
Non-renewable resource companies disestablished in 1976
1920s in Venezuela
1923 establishments in Venezuela
1976 disestablishments in Venezuela
Defunct energy companies of Venezuela